Abu Taleb Mia (1936-16 May 2007) is a Awami League politician and the former Member of Parliament of Rangpur-18. He represented Gaibandha.

Career
Mia was elected to parliament from Rangpur-18 as an Awami League candidate in 1973.

Death
Mia died on 16 May 2007.

References

Awami League politicians
1936 births
2007 deaths
1st Jatiya Sangsad members
People from Gaibandha District